Srishty Rode (born 24 September 1991) is an Indian television actress. In 2018, she was seen in Bigg Boss 12 as a celebrity contestant.

Early life 
Srishty Rode was born on 24 September 1991 in Mumbai, Maharashtra. Her father Tony Rode is a senior cinematographer and her mother Sadhna is a homemaker. Srishty also has an elder sister Shweta Rode in the family. Srishty studied at St. Louis Convent High School in Mumbai. She has completed graduation with a degree in Fine Arts from Mithibai College, Mumbai.

Career 
Rode started her acting career in 2007 by landing a role in Balaji Telefilms's Kuchh Is Tara for which she claims she received Rs 1,000. Later on, she started auditioning for television commercials and made a breakthrough with an advertisement for Hindustan Unilever's Fair and Lovely.

In 2010, she appeared in Yeh Ishq Haaye, and the following year she signed up for Zee TV's Chotti Bahu. She continued doing soap operas over the years. In 2018, she portrayed Fiza on Ishqbaaaz and in the same year, she participated in Colors TV's Bigg Boss 12 as a celebrity contestant. She was evicted from the show on Day 70.

In December 2018, just two days after her eviction from Bigg Boss, she confirmed that she has signed her debut film Gabru Gang.

Television

Special appearance

Films
 Gabru Gang - (TBA)

References

External links

 

Living people
Place of birth missing (living people)
Indian television actresses
Indian soap opera actresses
1991 births
Bigg Boss (Hindi TV series) contestants